NABBA may refer to: 

 National Amateur Body-Builders' Association 
 North American Brass Band Association